Elisabeta Guzganu-Tufan (née Tufan on 8 August 1964) is a retired Romanian foil fencer. She competed at the 1984, 1988 and 1992 Olympics and won a silver and a bronze team medal in 1984 and 1992, respectively. Her best individual result was fourth place in 1984. She won the individual world title in 1987 and team silver medals in 1987, 1993 and 1995. After retiring from competitions she worked as a fencing coach in Milan, Italy.

References

External links
 

1964 births
Living people
Romanian female fencers
Olympic fencers of Romania
Fencers at the 1984 Summer Olympics
Fencers at the 1988 Summer Olympics
Fencers at the 1992 Summer Olympics
Olympic silver medalists for Romania
Olympic bronze medalists for Romania
Sportspeople from Bucharest
Olympic medalists in fencing
Medalists at the 1984 Summer Olympics
Medalists at the 1992 Summer Olympics
Universiade medalists in fencing
Universiade gold medalists for Romania
Medalists at the 1983 Summer Universiade